Machaeropteris is a genus of moths belonging to the family Tineidae.

Species

Machaeropteris baloghi 	Gozmány, 1965
Machaeropteris eribapta 	Meyrick, 1915 (from Mozambique)
Machaeropteris encotopa Meyrick, 1922  (from India)
Machaeropteris euthysana 	Meyrick, 1931
Machaeropteris histurga 	Meyrick, 1915 (from Malawi)
Machaeropteris irritabilis 	Meyrick, 1932
Machaeropteris magnifica 	Gozmány, 1968
Machaeropteris ochroptera 	Gozmány, 1967
Machaeropteris petalacma 	 Meyrick, 1932 (Taiwan)
Machaeropteris phenax  Meyrick, 1911 (from Sri Lanka)
Machaeropteris plinthotripta (Meyrick, 1919)
Machaeropteris synaphria Meyrick, 1922  (from India)
Machaeropteris turbata Meyrick, 1922  (from India)

References

Myrmecozelinae
Tineidae genera